Hector David Saldivia (born March 2, 1984) is an Argentine professional boxer.

Professional career

On 27 March 2009, Hector won the World Boxing Association Fedelatin welterweight title after defeating Daudy Bahari in the first round via three knockdown rule.

Saldivia vs Said Oualik
On 2010, May 1, Saldivia loss his fight against Said Ouali in a World Boxing Association welterweight title eliminator by TKO in the first round.

"This Is It" vs Kell Brook
On 20 October 2012, Hector fought against Kell Brook, the winner would then become the mandatory challenger for the IBF welterweight world title held at the time by Randall Bailey. At a packed weigh in the day before the fight at Sheffield's Meadowhall Centre both fighters weighed in under the 147 lbs limit. Brook started strongly knocking Saldivia down midway through the first round. The second round was very similar with Saldivia unable to deal with Brook's superior accuracy and power. In the third Brook landed a solid well timed straight which sent the Argentinian to the floor again. This time he struggled to get up as his legs wobbled beneath him and the referee stopped the contest in the third round.

Saldivia vs Lujan
On 2015, February 18, Saldivia won the interim WBC Latino super welterweight title after defeating Sebastian Lujan on a Unanimous decision.

Saldivia vs Villalba
On 2017,August 26, Saldivia loses the Argentine scepter (Fab) by disqualification Ricardo Ruben Villalba
stays with his title (OMB) and wins the Argentine center (FAB) super welter

Professional boxing record

References

External links

Argentine male boxers

1984 births
Living people
People from Chubut Province
Light-middleweight boxers